is a Japanese multimedia franchise created by Hato. It consisted of an anime television series produced by Shin-Ei Animation and a video game developed by Tokyotoon and published by Hobibox and Shiravune. The former aired from October to December 2019, while the latter was released in January 2020.

Characters

Media

Anime
The series was first announced by Tokyotoon and Shin-Ei Animation in July 2019. The series was created and scripted by Hato, with Shin-Ei Animation producing the animation, Hirofumi Ogura directing, Eku Takeshima designing the characters, and Yūki Kishida composing the music. The series theme song is "#Null*Peta", performed by the main cast members. The series aired from October 4 to December 20, 2019. Internationally, the series is licensed by Crunchyroll outside of Asia.

Episode list

Video game
A video game for the franchise was announced at the same time as the anime. Titled Null & Peta: Invasion of the Queen Bug, the game was released on PC on January 30, 2020. It was developed by Tokyotoon and published by Hobibox and Shiravune.

Reception
Gary Hartley from Honest Gamers criticized the gameplay of the game as barebones while praising the visuals and characters. Azario Lopez of Noisy Pixel had similar feelings as Hartley, though also criticized the game for its text not always fitting in the text boxes.

Notes

References

External links
  
 

2019 anime television series debuts
2019 anime ONAs
AT-X (TV network) original programming
Crunchyroll anime
Mass media franchises
Mass media franchises introduced in 2019
Shin-Ei Animation
Video games developed in Japan
Windows games
Windows-only games